With Honors is a 1994 American comedy-drama film, directed by Alek Keshishian and starring Brendan Fraser, Joe Pesci and Moira Kelly.

Plot

Montgomery “Monty” Kessler is a senior majoring in Government at Harvard University and sharing a house with friends: art student Courtney, womanizing radio disc jockey Everett, and neurotic medical student Jeff. 

While Monty is working on his senior thesis, which takes a pessimistic view of citizens on public assistance, a power outage ruins his computer’s hard drive. When he rushes out to print a backup copy of his thesis, he trips on the street, breaking his leg, and drops his thesis down a grating into the boiler room under Widener Library. There Monty finds a homeless man, resembling the writer Walt Whitman, burning his thesis page by page. Monty calls the campus police who arrest the man, but they are unable to recover the thesis.

In court, Monty learns the man’s name is Simon Wilder. Simon gets the worst of the charges against him dismissed, but is held in contempt, for which Monty pays the fine. Despite Simon’s anger over Monty’s having him arrested, they work out a deal: for every service Monty provides, Simon will return one page of his thesis. Monty takes Simon to the house, letting him stay in a broken down van in the backyard.

Over time, Monty and Simon become close friends. Monty confides in Simon about his absent father, and Simon helps Monty see poor people like himself as human beings. Simon also shows Monty his collection of stones, each one representing a significant memory from his life. 

Monty’s roommates begin to like the arrangement as well, with Courtney appreciating Monty’s newfound open-mindedness and Everett giving Simon wine in exchange for repairing the van. However, Jeff refuses to let Simon stay in the house’s basement on a particularly cold night because of his parents’ visiting. When Monty lies to Simon about why he can’t come in the house, Simon ends their deal and leaves.

While everyone goes home for Christmas vacation, Monty stays to recompose his thesis. Simon sends a friend to deliver the thesis; he reveals where Simon is staying, but says he does not want to see Monty. Monty finds him living on the street, coughing and wheezing as a result of years' exposure to asbestos in the U.S. Merchant Marine. Monty agrees that Simon can live in the house and refuses his offer of a new deal. Simon gets disability benefits to help with the rent while Monty decides to completely rewrite his thesis. Courtney and Everett are supportive of Simon’s moving in, but Jeff is still unwelcoming.

Realizing the seriousness of his illness, Simon writes his obituary, which reveals that he left his wife and child to join the Merchant Marine. Though initially angry, Monty eventually forgives him and takes him as his guest to a campus pajama party. As Monty watches Courtney dance with another man, Simon encourages Monty to confess his love for her. Courtney reciprocates and the two begin a relationship.

Monty agrees to drive Simon to visit the son he abandoned, named Frank, despite the fact that doing so will delay the completion of his thesis. All the roommates, including Jeff, who has come to see Simon's humanity, make the long drive. Frank bitterly berates Simon for leaving him and is dismissive when Simon’s granddaughter asks who he is. Before leaving, Simon adds a stone to his collection.

Simon’s condition deteriorates on the drive back to the house; the roommates stay up all night reading Walt Whitman to him before he dies. At his funeral, Monty tearfully reads Simon’s obituary where he refers to the roommates as his family, and states that Monty ‘’will graduate life with honor and without regret.”

Monty meets with his haughty mentor, Professor Pitkannan, and explains why he changed his thesis to a more optimistic subject. Pitkannan accepts his explanation, but tells him his lateness means that he will not graduate with honors. Monty thanks him for his mentorship. He also returns the Walt Whitman book to Widener Library, symbolically leaving Simon’s spirit there.

The roommates graduate and Monty begins his own collection of memory stones.

Cast
 Joe Pesci as Simon B. Wilder
 Brendan Fraser as Montgomery "Monty" Kessler
 Moira Kelly as Courtney Blumenthal 
 Patrick Dempsey as Everett Calloway
 Josh Hamilton as Jeffrey Hawkes 
 Gore Vidal as Professor Pitkannan
 James Deuter as Judge
 Mara Brock Akil as Ms. Moore
 Shanesia Davis as Dr. Cecile Kay
 Claudia Haro as Marty

Production

The film was shot at various locations in Illinois, Indiana, Minnesota, and Massachusetts, including the Harvard University campus in Cambridge, Massachusetts. The exterior of Winthrop House appears, but the interiors pictured are not that of actual Harvard houses, and the last scene of the movie was shot at the University of Illinois at Urbana-Champaign. The buildings and surroundings were dressed up to look as if it were Harvard and many of the people in the final scene are Illinois students. The graduation scene was shot while the local climate in Illinois had not allowed for the trees to bloom leaves and so artificial branches and leaves were stapled on. All of the outdoor shots of Harvard's Widener Library had the University of Minnesota's Northrop Auditorium in that role. The scene in which Simon Wilder and Professor Pitkannan debate the role of the president in American democracy was filmed in Lincoln Hall at Northwestern Law School.

Reception
The film received predominantly negative reviews from critics. Review aggregator site Rotten Tomatoes collected 26 reviews and gave the film a 19% approval rating, with an average rating of 4.1/10. Roger Ebert of the Chicago Sun-Times gave the film 2.5 stars out of 4, praising the acting, but criticizing the "clichéd" plot.

According to Box Office Mojo, the film grossed about $20 million in the U.S. It was #1 at the U.S. weekend box office between May 6–8.

Year-end lists
 9th worst – Desson Howe, The Washington Post

Soundtrack

The soundtrack was released on March 22, 1994, by Maverick Records and Warner Bros. Records. It contains the U.S. No. 2 hit single and theme song "I'll Remember" by pop singer Madonna. She received nominations from the Golden Globes, Grammys, and MTV Movie Awards.

Seattle grunge band Mudhoney were asked to contribute a track to the soundtrack. In the liner notes from their compilation March to Fuzz written by the band, "They sent us a clip from the movie With Honors of some jock running through the snow with EMF's hit "Unbelievable" scoring the action. They said they were looking for an upbeat song like that for this part of the film. We told them that we had a bitchin' little instrumental that might work. They insisted on a song with words. So, I put some words on it and we sent down both versions, figuring they'd have to choose the instrumental. They didn't." The song, "Run Shithead Run," is included on the soundtrack but Mudhoney claims they never got another such request.

The Pretenders' cover of Bob Dylan's "Forever Young" also appeared in Free Willy 2: The Adventure Home as one of the two versions of the same song that was played in the movie.

"Thank You" – Duran Duran
"I'll Remember (Theme from With Honors)" – Madonna
"She Sells Sanctuary" – The Cult
"It's Not Unusual" – Belly
"Cover Me" – Candlebox
"Your Ghost" – Kristin Hersh and Michael Stipe
"Forever Young" – The Pretenders
"Fuzzy" – Grant Lee Buffalo
"Run Shithead Run" – Mudhoney
"Tribe" – Babble
"Blue Skies" – Lyle Lovett
"On the Wrong Side" – Lindsey Buckingham

References

External links
 
 
 

1994 films
1990s buddy comedy-drama films
1990s coming-of-age comedy-drama films
American buddy comedy-drama films
American coming-of-age comedy-drama films
1990s English-language films
Films set in Harvard University
Films set in Massachusetts
Films shot in Chicago
Films shot in Indiana
Films shot in Massachusetts
Films shot in Minnesota
Films directed by Alek Keshishian
1994 comedy films
1994 drama films
Films about homelessness
Films set in universities and colleges
1990s American films